Pinus engelmannii, commonly known as the Apache pine, is a tree of Northern Mexico, in the Sierra Madre Occidental with its range extending a short distance into the United States in southwestern New Mexico and southeastern Arizona.

The branches are sparse and very stout, giving the tree a distinct appearance. The Apache pine sometimes shows a grass stage like the related Michoacan pine (P. devoniana) and also longleaf pine (P. palustris).

The English name refers to the species' occurrence in the lands of the Apache Native Americans, while the scientific name commemorates the pioneering American botanist George Engelmann who discovered the species in 1848. Engelmann first named the species Pinus macrophylla, but this name had already been used for another pine, so it had to be renamed; this was done by the French botanist Carrière, who chose to honour Engelmann.

Apache pine was sometimes treated as a variety of ponderosa pine in the past (as P. ponderosa var. mayriana), but it is now universally regarded as a distinct species.

References

External links
 
 
 NRCS: USDA Plants Profile Pinus engelmannii, AZ: USDA Plants Database, NM: USDA Plants Database

engelmannii
Trees of Northwestern Mexico
Trees of the Southwestern United States
Trees of the South-Central United States
Least concern plants
Trees of North America
Trees of the United States
Flora of the Sierra Madre Occidental
Taxa named by Élie-Abel Carrière